Alefoso Yalayalatabua (22 January 1977 – 18 July 2020) was a Fijian rugby union player. He played as a prop. He played for Fiji Warriors.

Career

Yalayalatabua was first capped for Fiji, on 19 May 2007, aged 30, in a 3-8 loss to Samoa. He was in his country's squad at the 2007 Rugby World Cup finals, playing a single game, in the 12-55 loss to Australia. He had 10 caps for his national side, without ever scoring.

His ties to the Fijian military hindered his international career because of New Zealand and Australia's ban on the Fiji military, which meant he would not be able to compete at the 2011 Rugby World Cup.

External links

Fiji profile
Scrum profile

1977 births
2020 deaths
Fijian rugby union players
Rugby union props
Fiji international rugby union players
Sportspeople from Suva
I-Taukei Fijian people